Planctoteuthis danae, or Dana's Chiroteutid squid is a species of chiroteuthid squid. It is distinguished from further members of Planctoteuthis by a fin length greater than half of the mantle. During the paralarval stage, the species occurs in depths of 200–300 m, progressing to 200–800 m at 10-15mm ML; larger specimens have been captured from 700 m to in excess of 1000 m. The type locality of P. danae is in the Gulf of Panama, and it has also been recorded from the eastern Pacific Ocean and North Atlantic Ocean.

References

External links
Tree of Life web project: Planctoteuthis danae

Squid
Molluscs described in 1931